Andrés Felipe Robledo Londoño (born 12 December 1986), better known as Reykon "El Líder" "Pel mazo" , is a reggaeton performer from Colombia. He is considered one of the biggest proponents of Latin America's reggaeton music genre. He is from Envigado, Antioquia.

Musical career 
Since 2011, he has gained international fame releasing several songs including, "Se Aloca", "Te Gateo", "Tu Cuerpo me Llama", "El Besito", "Sin Miedo", "No Molestes Mas", "Tuturuwa", "Mi Noche", "Cuando Te Vi", and a lot more.

In 2012, he collaborated with Puerto Rican artist Daddy Yankee to release the song "Señorita" which quickly charted at number 1 in several Latin American countries including Peru, Ecuador, Chile, and several others.

In 2013, it was a successful year for him releasing the hit song "Mi Noche" which reached 60 million views on YouTube. His next single that he released 
in 2014 was called "Secretos" which was also successful and charted at number 1 on HTV.

In 2015, he signed with the music label Warner Latina. The label was assured that this signing would bring both of them success. Gabriela Martínez General Manager of Warner Music Latina stated that, "There is no better way to start of 2015 knowing that the talent of Reykon now forms part of the family; we share the same vision of having Reykon being a big star in Latin music."

Also in 2015, he released another song with Daddy Yankee called "Imaginádote" which charted on the Billboard charts and Monitor Latino in Colombia. He also got the chance to collaborate with Bebe Rexha and release the song "All The Way". This song was one of the songs nominated to be the official theme of the Copa Oro 2015.

He was also chosen to be one of the judges on Factor XF 2015.

Reykon was the special guest of a party and was invited by Teodoro Nguema Obiang Mangue, also known as Teodorin, son of the president of Equatorial Guinea, Teodoro Obiang Nguema Mbasogo. He was told by Teodorin when they first shook hands,"I know all your songs, I am a big fan, I am delighted to have you in my country." He is one of the very few artists to perform over there.

In 2017, his single Dejame Te Explico was awarded Platinum status in Colombia.

On May 4, 2018, he released his first studio album titled, El Lider. It has features from several urban artists including Daddy Yankee, Nicky Jam and Luigi 21 Plus.

Personal life 
In 2016, Reykon underwent surgery on his vocal chords and this temporarily halted his musical career due to the length of recovery.

In 2021, Reykon was involved in an altercation in Miami with Joe Fournier, a professional boxer. This altercation lead to a Triller boxing match on the Jake Paul vs. Ben Askren undercard. It has been scrutinized as Fournier, an experienced pro, is fighting a boxing amateur.

Discography

Studio albums 
El Lider (2018)

Singles 
 La Santa
 Señorita
 Sin Miedo
 No molestes Más
 Tuturuwa
 Cuando Te Vi
 Secretos
 Disfruta la Vida
 El Error
 Selfie
 El Chisme
 El Chisme remix (featuring J Alvarez And Kevin Roldan)
 Dejame Te Explico
 Pa' Eso (featuring Bryant Myers)
 TBT
 Mala
 Kiss (El Último Beso) (Featuring Kapla Y Miky)
 La Suite

Collaborations 
 "Señorita" (featuring Daddy Yankee)
 "Rapampam" (featuring Farruko)
 "Secretos" Remix (featuring Nicky Jam)
 "Se Aloca" (featuring J Balvin)
 "Renuncio" Remix (featuring Giovanny Ayala)
 "Tu Cuerpo Me Llama" (featuring Los Mortal Kombat)
 "301" (featuring Karol G)
 "Cuando Te Vi" (featuring Lil Silvio & El Vega)
 "La Noche es Una" (featuring Sonny & Vaech)
 "Mi Noche" (featuring Kannon)
 "El Besito" Remix (featuring Pasabordo)
 "Te Gateo" (featuring Pipe Calderon)
 "Te lo Juro Por Ti" (featuring Small)
 "Con Mi Flow" (featuring Magic Juan)
 "Cocoloco" (featuring Juancho Style)
 "Déjate Amar" Remix (featuring Yandel and D.Ozi)
 "Tal Como Eres" Remix (featuring Divino, Ñejo and J Álvarez)
 "Amor De Primavera" (featuring Lucas Arnau)
 "Imaginándote" (featuring Daddy Yankee)
 "Aquí No Paso Na" (featuring Golpe a Golpe)
 "Niña Bonita" (featuring Andre Marcel)
 "Hagamos Algo" (featuring Dani y Magneto)
 "Tu Ángel Guardián" (featuring Pipe Calderon)
 "Ella Entra En Calor" (featuring Mosta Man)
 "El Error" Remix (featuring Zion & Lennox)
 "De Sol a Sol" (featuring Alkilados, Sebastian Yatra and Martina La Peligrosa)
 "All The Way" (featuring Bebe Rexha)
 "Nuestro Planeta" (Kali Uchis featuring Reykon)
 "El Chisme Remix" (featuring J Alvarez And Kevin Roldan)
 "Brindare" (featuring Maja)
 "Delirio" (featuring Andy Rivera)
 "Pa Eso" (featuring Bryant Myers)
 "Bum Bum Dale Dale" (Maite Perroni featuring Reykon)
 "Medellín" (Kevin Roldan featuring Reykon and Ryan Castro)

Filmography

Awards and nominations

Premios Nuestra Tierra

Professional boxing record

References

External links
Official Site of Reykon

Living people
1986 births
Warner Music Latina artists
21st-century Colombian male singers